Kinsmon Lancaster (born April 9, 1986) is a former American football quarterback. He played for the Bossier-Shreveport Battle Wings of the Arena Football League. He was signed by the Toronto Argonauts as a wide receiver in 2009. He played college football at Louisiana–Monroe.

External links
Toronto Argonauts bio

1986 births
Living people
Players of American football from Shreveport, Louisiana
American players of Canadian football
American football quarterbacks
Canadian football quarterbacks
Canadian football wide receivers
Louisiana–Monroe Warhawks football players
Toronto Argonauts players
Bossier–Shreveport Battle Wings players